Juan Esquivel may refer to:
Juan Esquivel Barahona (c. 1560 – after 1625), Spanish composer of the Renaissance
Juan de Esquivel (d. 1523), Spanish Governor of Jamaica, 1510–1514
Juan Bautista Esquivel Lobo (b. 1980), Costa Rican footballer
Juan García Esquivel (1918–2002), Mexican band leader, pianist, and film composer
Juan Cruz Esquivel (b. 2000), Argentine footballer